Joseph S. Vaux (born 1972, in Islip, New York) is an American animator, and artist who works as a storyboard artist and animation director on TV show Family Guy. Vaux created the artwork for the character Goliath on the TV series Resident Alien. He lives in Culver City, California.

Family Guy episodes
Joe Vaux has directed  the following episodes:

"Mr. and Mrs. Stewie"
"Lois Comes Out of Her Shell"
"Turban Cowboy"
"A Fistful of Meg" (also co-written with Dominic Bianchi)
"Grimm Job"
"Chap Stewie"
"Stewie, Chris, and Brian's Excellent Adventure"
"Roasted Guy"
"Peter, Chris, & Brian"
"A Lot Going on Upstairs"
"Inside Family Guy"
"Peter's Def Jam"
"Three Directors"
"Send in Stewie, Please"
"Big Trouble in Little Quahog"
"Trump Guy"
"Girl, Internetted"
"Peter & Lois' Wedding"
"Boys & Squirrels"
"The Fatman Always Rings Twice"

References

External links
Joe Vaux interview at wowxwow.com

Living people
1972 births
American animators
American television directors
American animated film directors